Amélie Trayaud (11 March 1883 – 19 September 1963) was a French politician. She served in the French Resistance during World War II.

She was born Amélie Eugénie Duteyrat in Mansat-la-Courrière. She worked for the Société des transports en commun de la région parisienne. At the end of World War II, Trayaud was a member of the local liberation committee ("Comité local de Libération") under the National Front.

She was reelected in 1947 as a communist. After Robert Deloche was forced to resign as mayor, she served as mayor of Joinville-le-Pont from March to May 1953. Following the municipal election in May 1953, she served as municipal councillor until 1959.

In 1908, she married Louis Trayaud; he died in 1930.

She died in Joinville-le-Pont at the age of 80.

References 

1883 births
1963 deaths
Women mayors of places in France
Members of the Front National (French Resistance) movement
Female resistance members of World War II
20th-century French women